"Fakers Plague" (stylised in all caps) is a song by British metalcore band While She Sleeps. Produced by Carl Bown, the track was released as a standalone single on 6 December 2019, nine months after the release of the band's fourth studio album, So What?. The song is later included in the deluxe edition of the band's fifth studio album Sleeps Society, released on 3 June 2022. As lead guitarist Sean Long explained, the band had a lot of anger building up within them, and they thought it was amazing to come together and express the song through music.

Music video
Their music video for "Fakers Plague" was released on the same day as the single was streamed. The band released it along with a special phone-sized prism that let the viewers watch the video as a hologram projected from viewers' device.

Personnel
While She Sleeps
 Lawrence "Loz" Taylor – lead vocals
 Sean Long – lead guitar, backing vocals
 Mat Welsh – rhythm guitar, vocals, piano
 Aaran McKenzie – bass, backing vocals
 Adam "Sav" Savage – drums, percussion

References

2019 songs
2019 singles